Eager is a surname. Notable people with the surname include:

Allen Eager (1927–2003), American jazz tenor saxophonist
Almeron Eager (1838-1902), American farmer, businessman, and politician
Ben Eager (born 1984), Canadian professional ice hockey player
Brenda Lee Eager (born 1947), American soul singer, songwriter and musical theatre performer
Clay Eager (1925–1995), American rockabilly and country music singer
Edward Eager (1911–1964), American lyricist, playwright, and children's book author
Helen Eager (born 1952), Australian painter and printmaker
Kenneth Eager (1929–2013), English sculptor
Mark Eager (born 1962), English-born conductor and trombonist
Samuel W. Eager (1789–1860), U.S. Representative from New York
Vince Eager (born 1940), stage name of Roy Taylor, British pop singer